The Gabriele Possanner State Prize (German: Gabriele-Possanner-Staatspreis) is a state award for feminist research in Austria, named for Gabriele Possanner. It was established in 1997, and is awarded every second year by the Federal Ministry of Science and Research.

Laureates

References 

Austrian awards
Feminism in Europe